In mathematics, Hilbert algebras and left Hilbert algebras occur in the theory of von Neumann algebras in:

 Commutation theorem for traces#Hilbert algebras 
 Tomita–Takesaki theory#Left Hilbert algebras

Von Neumann algebras